Valery Petrovich Slauk (born 1947) is a Belarusian graphic artist, book illustrator, and professor at the Belarusian Academy of Arts. His works are exhibited in the National Art Museum of Belarus and in several museums abroad.

Awards and decorations
Slauk has been recipient of multiple awards, including:
2015: The title of 
2010: Medal of Francysk Skaryna

References

1947 births
Living people
Belarusian artists